Muhammad Dilawar Qureshi is a Pakistani politician who had been a Member of the Provincial Assembly of Sindh, from May 2013 to May 2018.

Early life and education
He was born on 16 June 1979 in Hyderabad, Pakistan.

He has a degree of Master of Arts in English, a degree of Master of Arts in Political Science, and a degree of Bachelor of Laws.

He also has a degree of Master of Laws and Doctor of Philosophy in Law.

Political career

He was elected to the Provincial Assembly of Sindh as a candidate of Mutahida Quami Movement from Constituency PS-45 HYDERABAD-I	 in 2013 Pakistani general election.

References

Living people
Sindh MPAs 2013–2018
1979 births
Muttahida Qaumi Movement politicians